Queen's Dock may refer to:
Queen's Dock, Port of Liverpool
Queen's Dock, Swansea
Queen's Dock, Glasgow (see SEC Centre)
Queen's Dock, Hull